Mordellistena marginicollis is a species of beetle is the family Mordellidae.

References

marginicollis
Beetles described in 1854